Seyyedan (also Romanized as Seyyedān; also known as Seydū, Seydūn, Sīdān, and Sīdu) is a village in Qaleh Zari Rural District, Jolgeh-e Mazhan District, Khusf County, South Khorasan Province, Iran. At the 2006 census, its population was 133, in 37 families.

References 

Populated places in Khusf County